Maud Barger-Wallach won the singles tennis title of the 1908 U.S. Women's National Singles Championship by defeating reigning champion Evelyn Sears 6–3, 1–6, 6–3  in the challenge round. Barger-Wallach had won the right to challenge Sears by defeating Marie Wagner 4–6, 6–1, 6–3 in the final of the All Comers' competition. The event was played on outdoor grass courts and held at the Philadelphia Cricket Club in Wissahickon Heights, Chestnut Hill, Philadelphia, from June 22 through June 27, 1908.

Draw

Challenge round

All Comers' finals

References

1908
1908 in women's tennis
June 1908 sports events
1908 in American women's sports
Women's Singles
Chestnut Hill, Philadelphia
1900s in Philadelphia
1908 in sports in Pennsylvania
Women's sports in Pennsylvania